King Otto is a 2021 feature film directed by Christopher André Marks. The film tells the story of the victory of the Greece National Football Team at the 2004 European Championships.

Plot
The Greece National Football Team at UEFA Euro 2004 are ranked 300 - 1, and had never won a game in a major international football tournament. Otto Rehhagel has left everything behind in his native Germany to take on the underachieving national team. Matched against the giants of European football, the coach and the team come together to write a new chapter in Greek mythology and to achieve one of the biggest shocks in sports history.

Reception 
The Guardian in the United Kingdom gave the film 4 stars calling it "thoughtful and indeed, erudite" claiming that the climax moment of the film, when the Greeks win the Euro was "one of the most uplifting things I have ever seen". The Australian credited the filmmakers giving the film 4 out of 4 stars saying "full marks must be awarded to director Christopher André Marks for telling this real life feel good story so well and so entertainingly." The Sydney Morning Herald said the film is "technically a documentary but comes across as an Aesopian fable" . Maxim Magazine called the film "a fairytale for modern times" and Financial Review said: "Christopher André Marks’ irresistible documentary King Otto manages to confirm and confound every idea about the contrasts between the Greeks and the Germans.... the Athenians must have partied hard after they defeated the Persians in the battle of Marathon in 490BC – but not like this."  The German press unanimously heralded the film with the Frankfurter Allgemeine Zeitung praising the film as  "a brilliant documentary, impressive and touching. Der Spiegel called the film "a fairytale" and Kolner Stadt-Anzeiger praised the film as "cinema at its finest... bravo!". Süddeutsche Zeitung stated that the movie "was a very solid, very well made homage to Otto, the very first." The Greek press reviewed the film positively with the top critics at Proto Thema, 24/7 News and Athens Voice giving the film high marks. Proto Thema called the film "exemplary" and Kathimerini profiled the director and called the story of 2004 "our favorite national fairy tale" with To Vima also covering the film favorably. In the United Kingdom, the BBC called it "a beautiful, beautiful film" with The Times and The Daily Telegraph choosing it as a 'Critic's Pick' upon release. In the United States, Noel Murray of the Los Angeles Times called the film "entertaining - a great story, crisply told. "

Release 

The film was released in over 75 countries worldwide either theatrically or on streaming platforms making it one of the widest released Greek language films on record. It had its World Premiere in Melbourne, Australia at The Astor Theatre to multiple sold out preview screenings and was then released nationally in over 80 cinemas across Australia. On the day of the theatrical release, Melbourne went into a total lockdown and cinemas were closed for weeks preventing the film from having its full theatrical run in Victoria. The Greek premiere was held at the Zappeion in the National Garden of Athens with the players of the 2004 Greece National Team, Otto Rehhagel, Ioannis Topalidis, producer Shani Hinton and director Christopher André Marks in attendance. The film was subsequently released theatrically nationwide in Greece. The German premiere was held at the historic Lichtburg cinema in Essen on Nov 11, 2021 in the hometown of Otto Rehhagel. The sold out theatre of 1,000 + gave the film and its star, Otto Rehhagel, a loud standing ovation and cheered throughout the premiere as if in a football stadium. As Kicker notes, "Applause, cheering and singing resounded again and again..." On the first day of the German release, Otto Rehhagel was honored with his hands moulded into gold to adorn the walls of the Lichtburg lobby. The film was also released on SKY UK and Amazon Prime Video in the United Kingdom, Warner Bros. Discovery in South America, Viaplay in the Nordics and Al Jazeera in the Middle East among other territories. It can also be seen on Qantas, Emirates (airline) and Lufthansa Airlines entertainment systems. The film was released theatrically in the United States and Canada on March 25, 2022, Greek Independence Day. It had theatrical runs in New York, Chicago, Boston, SF, Los Angeles and Toronto among others. The North American premiere was held at the Museum of Modern Art in Manhattan with "ambassadors, diplomats, media personalities, athletes and hundreds of others".

References 

Greek documentary films
Documentary films about association football
2021 films
Greece national football team
2021 documentary films